Imhotep Institute Charter High School is a public charter high school located in Philadelphia, Pennsylvania. It was founded in 1998 to offer an African-centered education that emphasizes STEM subjects.

During the 2015–16 school year, the school reported a student body of 651 pupils, the most in the school's history.

In 2017, Imhotep reported an average SAT score of 1031 out of 1600, which made it the 17th lowest-scoring Pennsylvania high school.

Notable alumni
Yasir Durant, American football player
D. J. Moore, American football player
Shaka Toney, American football player
David Williams, American football player

References

External links

Educational institutions established in 1998
Charter schools in Pennsylvania
Public high schools in Pennsylvania
High schools in Philadelphia
1998 establishments in Pennsylvania